Calceolaria martinezii is a species of plant in the Calceolariaceae family. It is endemic to the Ambato plateau in central Ecuador, where it is known from only two subpopulations: one on the slopes of the Tungurahua volcano, and another close to the town of Patate.

References

Endemic flora of Ecuador
martinezii
Endangered plants
Taxonomy articles created by Polbot
Taxa named by Friedrich Wilhelm Ludwig Kraenzlin